Hendrica Leurs (1794–1870), was a Dutch educator. She was the central figure in a famous Dutch court case in 1837.

She was the daughter of the surgeon William Leurs (ca 1753-1801) and Maria Anthonia Bergman (d. 1802). Leurs worked as a governess, and successfully managed her own girls school in Utrecht from 1833. In 1836, large amounts of false printed banknotes circulated in the Netherlands. The banknotes were traced to Leurs, who were trialed in 1837. She denied the accusation and claimed the notes were given to her by a bank clerk. She was charged with having manufactured the banknotes herself to distribute to uneducated people who would not observe her handwriting on them, and the prosecutor demanded death penalty on the grounds that she could have caused a financial crisis. Her defense attorney, however, claimed that the spelling errors on the false notes could not be expected from the hand of a school teacher, that she did not have time to manufacture them and that her school was successful and highly regarded and that she did not have an economic reason to engage in forgery. Hendrica Leurs was acquitted from charges, but she was unable to keep her school and emigrated to the Dutch East Indies, where she opened a school in Surakarta.

References 
 Willemien Schenkeveld, Leurs, Hendrica Johanna Christina, in: Digitaal Vrouwenlexicon van Nederland. URL: http://resources.huygens.knaw.nl/vrouwenlexicon/lemmata/data/leurs [13/01/2014]

1794 births
1870 deaths
19th-century Dutch educators
19th-century Dutch East Indies people
19th-century Dutch businesspeople